The North Wind is a painting by Australian painter Frederick McCubbin, thought to have been painted in around 1888. The painting depicts a young family—the woman and child in a dray, the man and a dog on foot—making "its way down a bush track, buffeted by the treacherous ‘north wind’".

The painting was acquired by the National Gallery of Victoria (NGV) in 1941 through the Felton Bequest. The NGV undertook a major restoration of the painting in 2014 funded with assistance from the Bank of America Merrill Lynch Art Conservation Project.

References

External links
The North Wind - National Gallery of Victoria

1888 paintings
Horses in art
Paintings by Frederick McCubbin
Paintings in the collection of the National Gallery of Victoria